Here are lists of Single-sex education (schools which only admit Boys, or those which only admit boys at certain levels/years/grades), or those which follow the Diamond Schools model (separating students by gender at points), by country.

Australia
 Tasmania
 The Hutchins School
 St. Virgil's College
 Australian Capital Territory
 St Edmund's College, Canberra
 Marist College, Canberra
 New South Wales
 Ashfield Boys High School
 Asquith Boys High School
 Balgowlah Boys Campus
 Blacktown Boys High School
 Canterbury Boys' High School
 Christian Brothers College,Burwood
 Christian Brothers High School
 Cranbrook School 
 James Cook Boys Technology High School
 Epping Boys High School
 Farrer Memorial Agricultural High School
 Homebush Boys High School
 The Kings School
 Knox Grammar School
 Normanhurst Boys' High School
 Punchbowl Boys High School
 Randwick Boys High School
 Saint Ignatius' College Riverview
 Sydney Boys High School
 Sydney Church of England Grammar School
 Trinity Grammar School Summerhill
 Queensland
 The Southport School Gold Coast
 Marist College Ashgrove
 Moreton Bay Boys' College
 St. Joseph's Nudgee College
 Brisbane Boys College
 Anglican Church Grammar School
 Brisbane Grammar School
 Padua College
 St Augustine's College (Queensland)
 St. Brendan's College, Yeppoon
 St Joseph's College, Gregory Terrace
 St Laurence's College
 Western Australia
 Hale School
 St Peter's College
 Aquinas College Salter Point
 Christ Church Grammar School, Claremont
 Mazenod College, Lesmurdie
 Victoria
 Brighton Grammar School
 Melbourne High School
 Scotch College, Melbourne
 St Joseph's College, Geelong
 Trinity Grammar School, Kew
 Yeshivah College, Australia
 Xavier College
 South Australia
 Blackfriars Priory School
 Christian Brothers College
 St Peter's College, Hackney
 St Paul's College, Adelaide
 Wesley College
 Prince Alfred College Kent Town
 Rostrevor College Woodforde
 North Adelaide Grammar School
 Former boys' schools
 The Armidale School, NSW (Now co-educational)
 Macquarie Boys Technology High School
 Maryborough Boys' High School, merged into Maryborough State High School
 Newcastle Boys' High School, (now coeducational)
 Southwood Boys' Grammar School, merged into Tintern Grammar
 The School, Mount Victoria
 New Town High School, Tasmania (to become co-educational)
 Horton College Tasmania, closed in 1894
 Guildford Grammar School.(Now coeducational)
 St Patrick's College, Launceston, Tasmania (Now coeducational)
 Launceston Grammar School, Tasmania (Now coeducational)
 Scotch College, became Scotch Oakburn College (Tasmania)

Austria
 Former
 Theresianum (now coeducational)

Azerbaijan
 Agdash Private Turkish High School
 Former
 Baku Dede Gorgud Private Turkish High School (closed)
 Baku Private Turkish High School (closed)
 Sharur Turkish High School (closed)

Brunei
 Ma'had Islam Brunei
 Muda Hashim Secondary School
 Rimba Arabic Secondary School
 Sultan Omar Ali Saifuddien College

Note: Hassanal Bolkiah Boys' Arabic Secondary School, despite its name, admits both male and female students.

Canada

British Columbia

Vancouver 

St. George's School (Vancouver)
Vancouver Christian School

Ontario 
 St. Andrew's College, Aurora

Toronto 

 Brebeuf College School
Chaminade College School
Neil McNeil High School
St. Michael's College School
Upper Canada College
Royal St. George's College
Former:
 Michael Power High School, merged into Michael Power/St. Joseph High School
 De La Salle College (now coeducational)

Quebec 
 Former
 Collège Jean-de-Brébeuf (now coeducational)

Cyprus
 Former
 American Academy of Larnaca (now coeducational)

Ethiopia
 St Joseph's School, Addis Ababa

Fiji
 Toorak Boys’ School

France
 Chavagnes International College

Gibraltar

 Bayside Comprehensive School

Greece
 Fifth Boys Gymnasium of Thessaloniki (closed)
A non-profit public secondary school in the city of Thessaloniki's Analipsi neighborhood, comprised 3-year junior high school and 3-year high school (six-grade), and also Higher Education entrance education. Previous was the Villa Mehmet Kapandji, today is The Cultural Centre of Education Foundation of National Bank of Greece.

Guam

 Father Dueñas Memorial School

Guernsey

 Elizabeth College, Guernsey

Hong Kong

Hungary
 Benedictine High School of Pannonhalma

India
Please see, :Category:Boys' schools in India.

Iran
Since the Iranian Revolution government schools have been divided by gender
 Tehran International School has separate campuses for boys.

Iraq
 Baghdad
 Baghdad College

Al Mutamayizeen Secondary has boys' schools.

Jamaica
 Alpha Boys School
 Cornwall College
 Jamaica College
 Munro College
 St. George's College

Japan

Jersey

 De La Salle College, Jersey
 Victoria College, Jersey

Kenya
 Alliance High School (Kenya)
 Highway Secondary School
 St. Mary's School, Nairobi
 Starehe Boys' Centre and School
 Maranda High School

South Korea
 Kyunggi High School

Lebanon
 Became coeducational
 American Boys College (now International College, Beirut)

Luxembourg
 Now coeducational
 Lycée de Garçons Esch-sur-Alzette (since 1969)
 Lycée de Garçons de Luxembourg (since the 1960s)

Malaysia
 English College Johore Bahru
 Methodist Boys' School, Kuala Lumpur
 Royal Military College
 Victoria Institution

Malta
 St. Edward's College, Malta
 St. Michael School (Malta)

Mauritius
 Ebène State Secondary School (Boys)
 Cosmopolitan College (Boys)
 Windsor College Boys

Mexico
 Bachillerato Anáhuac Campus Monterrey

Irish Institute in the State of Mexico has a separate campus for boys.

Universidad Panamericana Preparatoria in Mexico City has a separate campus for boys.

Namibia
 Former boys schools
 St. Paul's College, Namibia, (now coeducational)

Nepal
 Former boys schools
 St. Xavier's School, Godavari (became coeducational in 1996)

New Zealand
 Auckland Region
 Auckland Grammar School
 De La Salle College, Mangere East
 Dilworth School
 Kelston Boys' High School
 King's College, Auckland (Junior only)
 King's School, Auckland
 Liston College
 Rosmini College
 Sacred Heart College, Auckland
 Saint Kentigern Boys' School
 St Paul's College, Auckland
 St Peter's College, Auckland
 Westlake Boys High School
 Saint Kentigern College has gender separation in some classes

 Bay of Plenty Region
 Rotorua Boys' High School
 Tauranga Boys' College

 Canterbury region
 Christchurch Boys' High School
 Christ's College, Christchurch
 Medbury School
 Shirley Boys' High School
 St Bede's College, Christchurch
 St Thomas of Canterbury College
 Timaru Boys' High School

 Gisborne Region
 Gisborne Boys' High School

 Hawke's Bay Region
 Hastings Boys' High School
 Hereworth School
 Lindisfarne College, New Zealand
 Napier Boys' High School
 St John's College, Hastings
 Te Aute College
 Te Aratika Academy

 Manawatū-Whanganui
 Hato Paora College
 Palmerston North Boys' High School

 Marlborough Region
 Marlborough Boys' College

 Northland Region
 Whangarei Boys' High School

 Otago region
 John McGlashan College
 King's High School, Dunedin
 Otago Boys' High School
 Waitaki Boys' High School

 Southland region
 Southland Boys' High School

 Taranaki Region
 Francis Douglas Memorial College
 New Plymouth Boys' High School

 Tasman District
 Nelson College
 Nelson College Preparatory School

 Waikato region
 Hamilton Boys' High School
 St John's College, Hamilton
 St Paul's Collegiate School (Junior only)

 Wellington Region
 Hutt International Boys' School (Upper Hutt)
 St Bernard's College, Lower Hutt
 St Patrick's College, Kilbirnie, Wellington
 St Patrick's College, Silverstream
 Rathkeale College
 Rongotai College
 Wellesley College, New Zealand
 Wellington College, Wellington

 Former boys' schools
 Waihi School (coeducational since 2021)

Nigeria
 Abia State
 Government College Umuahia
 Marist Brothers' Juniorate, Uturu
 Akwa Ibom State
 Holy Family College, Abak
 Methodist Boys' High School, Oron
 Anambra State
 Bishop Crowther Seminary
 Christ the King College, Onitsha
 Benue State
 St. Andrew's Secondary School, Adikpo
 Delta State
 Government College Ughelli 
 Ebonyi State
 Government Secondary School, Afikpo
 Imo State
 Government Secondary School, Owerri
 Lagos State
 Eko Boys' High School
 Methodist Boys' High School
 Ogun State
 Baptist Boys' High School
 Ijebu Ode Grammar School
 King's College, Lagos
 Nigerian Navy Secondary School, Abeokuta
 Oyo State
 Government College, Ibadan
 Plateau State
 Air Force Military School, Jos, Nigeria

Pakistan
Government schools in this country are divided by gender
 Army Burn Hall College boys' campuses
 Islamabad College for Boys
 PAF College Lower Topa
 Sacred Heart High School for Boys

Philippines
 Aquinas School
 Don Bosco Technical Institute of Makati
 Lourdes School of Mandaluyong
 PAREF Northfield School
 PAREF Southridge School
 PAREF Springdale School
 PAREF Westbridge School
 Xavier School

Saudi Arabia
Government schools in this country are divided by gender
 Al-Thager Model School

Singapore
 Hwa Chong Institution Boys High School
 Victoria School

South Africa
 Eastern Cape
Graeme College
St Andrews College
Grey High School
Queen's College Boys' High School
Dale College
Selborne College
Muir College

 Free State
Grey College
St Andrew's School

 Gauteng
 Parktown Boys' High School
 Pretoria Boys High School
 St Stithians College 
 Springs Boys' High School
King Edward VII School
 Christian Brothers' College, Boksburg
 Afrikaanse Hoër Seunskool
St John's College
 St David's Marist, Inanda
 Jeppe High School for Boys
 St Benedict's College, Bedfordview
 St Alban's College
 St Declan's School for Boys
 Athlone Boys High School
 Highlands North Boys High School

 KwaZulu-Natal
 Drakensberg Boys' Choir School
 St Charles College
 Kearsney College
 Michaelhouse
Hilton College
 Clifton School
 Durban High School
Northwood School
Glenwood High School
 Maritzburg College
 Westville Boys High School
 Pinetown Boys' High School

 Northern Cape
 Kimberley Boys' High School

 North West
 Potchefstroom High School for Boys

 Western Cape
 Hoër Landbouskool Boland
 Diocesan College
 Paarl Boys' High School
 Wynberg Boys' High School
 Rondebosch Boys High School
 Paul Roos Gymnasium
 South African College Schools
 Star College Bridgetown

Taiwan (Republic of China)
 Taipei Municipal Jianguo High School

Tanzania
 Kibaha Secondary School

Turkey
 Now coeducational
 Lycée Saint-Joseph, Istanbul (became coeducational in 1987)
 Moved
 American Boys College (now International College, Beirut) (was in Izmir/Smyrna, moved to Lebanon)

Uganda
 Jinja College
 Namilyango College
 St. Mary's College Kisubi

United Kingdom

United States

Zambia
 Former boys' schools
 David Kaunda Technical High School (now coeducational)

Zimbabwe
 Kutama College (officially St Francis Xavier College)
 Peterhouse Boys' School

By former countries

Ottoman Empire

 Adana Vilayet
 Adrianople Vilayet
 Bulgarian Men's High School of Adrianople
 Aydin Vilayet
 American Boys College (now International College, Beirut) (Smyrna (now Izmir))
 Constantinople Vilayet
 Lycée Saint-Joseph, Istanbul
 Salonika Vilayet
 Bulgarian Men's High School of Thessaloniki (Salonika)

See also
 Lists of girls' schools

References

Lists of schools